Novy Subay (Yañı Subay) is a rural locality (a selo) and the administrative centre of Novosubayevsky Selsoviet, Nurimanovsky District, Bashkortostan, Russia. The population was 346 as of 2010. There are 4 streets.

Geography 
Novy Subay is located 23 km east of Krasnaya Gorka (the district's administrative centre) by road. Kaznatash is the nearest rural locality.

References 

Rural localities in Nurimanovsky District